Índio Gigante, also known as Indian Giant, is a breed of domestic chicken originally developed in Brazil. It is one of the largest chicken breeds in the world, especially in terms of height.

History 
The Índio Gigante originated in Brazil around the late 1980s or early 1990s in the states of Minas Gerais and Goiás.

It was created by crossbreeding large gamecocks — "Malayoid" breeds such as the Shamo and the Malay — with caipira chickens (rustic mixed breeds); Plymouth Rocks also may have been used in these crosses. Over time, breeders selected the largest specimens, resulting in the current animals. 

Currently, the Índio Gigante has a defined standard and a Brazilian association — Associação Brasileira de Criadores de Índio Gigante (ABRACIG) — to better organize the continuation and genetic improvement of the breed. Within the 2020s, ABRACIG expects the Índio Gigante to receive official recognition as the first pure breed of chicken to originate from Brazil.

"Índio Gigante" is Portuguese for "Indian Giant"; "Índio" (Indian) in Brazil refers to indigenous Brazilians and their culture (see also Native American name controversy).

Characteristics 
To be considered an Índio Gigante, the rooster should be at least 105 centimeters (1.05 meters), with a minimum weight of 4.5 kilograms as an adult, and the hen should be at least 90 centimeters, with a minimum weight of 3 kilograms as an adult. In addition to these most striking and visible characteristics, there are characteristics such as plumage, beak, etc., which must be observed according to the official standard.

The measurement of the size of the animal is made from the tip of the nail of the middle finger of the paw to the tip of the beak holding the chicken so that it is fully stretched, usually horizontally, because in this position it is usually calm and easier to measure.

The tallest roosters from elite genetics can reach 124 centimeters.

References 

Chicken breeds
Chicken breeds originating in Brazil